Pacanga is a town in Northern Peru, capital of the district Pacanga in Chepén Province of the region La Libertad. This town is located some 143 km north Trujillo city and is primarily an agricultural center in the Jequetepeque Valley.

Nearby cities
Chepén
Guadalupe
Pacasmayo

See also
Jequetepeque Valley
Pacasmayo
Chepén

External links
Location of Pacanga by Wikimapia

References

Populated places in La Libertad Region